is a Japanese-American concert violinist. Goto gained attention as a child prodigy, first performing at the age of seven in the Pacific Music Festival held in Sapporo, Japan. In 2006, his debut tour of 12 cities of Japan was sold out.

Early life
Goto's mother is a violinist. His elder (by 17 years) half-sister, Midori, is an internationally renowned violinist. Goto began playing violin at age three. He credits his mother for both his and his half-sister's success as musicians.

Career
Goto has performed internationally as a soloist with the London Symphony Orchestra, the Orpheus Chamber Orchestra, the Shanghai Philharmonic, the U.S. National Symphony Orchestra, the London Philharmonic Orchestra, the Toscanini Symphonica in Italy, the New Zealand Symphony Orchestra, the Bamberg Symphony, New Symphony Orchestra (Bulgaria), the European Union Youth Orchestra, Vancouver Symphony Orchestra, and the KZN Philharmonic Orchestra of South Africa Ryu has performed in such prestigious venues as Carnegie Hall, Kennedy Center, Tokyo Suntory Hall, Sydney Opera House, Shanghai Grand Theater, Taipei National Concert Hall, Vienna Musikverein, Munich's Herkulessaal and the Philharmonic Hall Gasteig.

Goto performed at the World Trade Center site during the official September 11 commemoration ceremony in 2003 and at the peace memorial concerts in Hiroshima and Nagasaki in 2005. In 2005, Universal Music signed Goto to its Deutsche Grammophon label. In 2009, Goto played with the Ditto Ensemble in Korea, and was scheduled to appear with them in the summer of 2010 in Japan. In 2010, he made his Carnegie Hall debut. In 2014, he appeared to represent Japan at the Festival Internacional Cervantino in Mexico.

Goto graduated from Harvard University with a BA in Physics in 2011. He regularly played with the Bach Society Orchestra.

Playing style
Goto has been influenced by electric guitarists such as Jimi Hendrix, and sometimes uses an aggressive playing style described as "ferocious" or "fiery."

Instrument
Goto plays the 1722 Stradivarius "Jupiter, ex-Goding" violin on loan to him from Nippon Music Foundation since December 2013. Formerly, Midori also played it.

Personal life
Goto has a black belt in karate, and holds a degree in physics from Harvard (2011), where he is a member of the Phoenix SK Club. He also plays guitar. In addition to classical he likes jazz, pop and electronic music.

Discography
DVD:
Ryu Goto, Brahms Violin Concerto in D Major Op.77 – May 2006
Ryu Goto, Violin Recital 2006 – March 2007

CD/Digital
Ryu – July 2005
'Ryu Goto, Violin Recital 2006  – January 2007Live in Suntory Hall 2004 – August 2007The Four Seasons'' – June 2009

References

External links

1988 births
Living people
American classical violinists
American male violinists
American classical musicians of Japanese descent
Trinity School (New York City) alumni
Harvard College alumni
Japanese classical violinists
21st-century classical violinists
21st-century American male musicians
Male classical violinists
21st-century American violinists